The Turmus Ayya Equestrian Club is an equestrian club in the town of Turmus Ayya, between Ramallah and Nablus in the Palestinian territories.

The club was founded by Ashraf Rabi in 2007.  Rabi was born in Turmus Ayya but emigrated to Panama as a youth of 16, and from there to the United States, where he dreamed of returning one day to his home town and "building a house with a stable full of horses."  The Turmus Aya Equestrian Club is the fulfillment of that dream.

Rabi built his dream house and stable, but he notices that many children would come to his stable to watch the horses. That was what led him to build an Equestrian Club with a mission making horseback riding accessible for all  Palestinians.

The Turmus Ayya Club offers stabling and care for private horse owners and trains riders in jumping and dressage. 

Al-Frangi, had been riding at the Club for ten years when he spoke to a reporter in 2007 and who and has ridden for the Palestinian National Jumping Team explained the difficulty of competing internationally with inadequate funding.  “When we are competing at any place outside of the country, when they see us riding they are impressed that we really know how to ride,” he said “They ask how we can ride the way we do without having anything in Palestine.”

References

External links
 Turmus Ayya Equestrian Club homepage
 
 

Companies based in the State of Palestine
Tourist attractions in the State of Palestine
Sport in the West Bank
Horse racing venues in the State of Palestine